Franz Josef Freiherr von Gruben (February 13, 1829, Düsseldorf – October 23, 1888, Regensburg) was a 19th-century German Catholic social politician, member of the German Reichstag, poet, lawyer, artist and Head of the Princely House of Thurn und Taxis in Regensburg.

Life
Franz Gruben was born on 13 February 1829 in Düsseldorf. He attended the Friedrich-Wilhelm-gymnasium in Cologne until 1847 and studied law and political science in Berlin and Bonn. He enlisted in the Royal service of Justice at the District Court in Cologne in 1850, and in 1856 he was appointed the district court assistant judge. Then he worked with the Royal Government in Koblenz until the autumn of 1857, when he left the civil service in 1858 to take a position in the administration of the Princely House of Thurn und Taxis. There, he became Head of the overall management until 1877 when he retired.

From 1881 until his death on 23 October 1888 in Regensburg, he was a member of the German Reichstag for the constituency of Upper Palatinate, Regensburg, Burglengenfeld, Stadtamhof and the German Centre Party.

Works
Die soziale Frage – Speech on the 31st General Assembly of the Catholics of Germany to Amberg, 1 September 1884.
Die Sozialpolitik der Kirche – History of the social development in the Christian west, Regensburg, 1881.

References

Attribution
This article is based on the translation of the corresponding article of the German Wikipedia. A list of contributors can be found there at the History section.

External links
Franz Joseph von Gruben on the catalog of the Deutsche Nationalbibliothek.

1829 births
1888 deaths
Politicians from Düsseldorf
People from the Rhine Province
Barons of Germany
German Roman Catholics
Centre Party (Germany) politicians
Members of the 5th Reichstag of the German Empire
Members of the 6th Reichstag of the German Empire
Members of the 7th Reichstag of the German Empire